Gustav Jung (4 June 1945 – 15 January 2000) was a German football player. He spent seven seasons in the Bundesliga with FC Bayern Munich, Wuppertaler SV Borussia and Karlsruher SC.

Honours
 Bundesliga champion: 1968–69
 DFB-Pokal winner: 1968–69

References

External links
 

1945 births
German footballers
Germany under-21 international footballers
FC Bayern Munich footballers
Wuppertaler SV players
Karlsruher SC players
Bundesliga players
2000 deaths
Association football forwards
20th-century German people